Tanec snov is a Slovak reality television that premiered on March 8, 2015, on the television channel JOJ. The concept of the series presents nine local celebrities coupled with an equal number of dancers to "dance their dream" in common. Viliam Rozboril and Barbora Rakovská have been hosting the show since, while Eva Máziková, Ján Ďurovčík and Peter Modrovský, these were promoted as the judges for the series opening season. Apart from that, a guest judge will appear per episode too.

Couples
The nine couples featuring selected celebrities and their dancing partners:

Scoring charts

Red numbers indicate the lowest score for each week
Green numbers indicate the highest score for each week
 the couple eliminated that week
 the returning couple finishing in the bottom two
 this couple withdrew from the competition
 the winning couple
 the runner-up couple
 the third-place couple

Average score chart
This table only counts for dances scored on a 40-point scale.

Highest and lowest scoring performances
The best and worst performances in each dance according to the judges' 40-point scale are as follows:

Couples' highest and lowest scoring dances
Scores are based upon a potential 40-point maximum.

Week 1 
Individual judges scores in the chart below (given in parentheses) are listed in this order from left to right: Ján Koleník, Ján Ďurovčík, Eva Máziková, Peter Modrovský.

Couples performed the waltz or cha-cha-cha.
Running order

Week 2 
Individual judges scores in the chart below (given in parentheses) are listed in this order from left to right: Lucia Barmošová, Ján Ďurovčík, Eva Máziková, Peter Modrovský.

Due Ján Dobrík's injury, his dance partner Dominika will dance with actor Ján Koleník in week 2.

Couples performed the quickstep or rumba.

Running order

Week 3 
Individual judges scores in the chart below (given in parentheses) are listed in this order from left to right: Ján Dobrík, Ján Ďurovčík, Eva Máziková, Peter Modrovský.

Ján Dobrík and Dominika Geregová withdrew from the competition and were replaced by Lukáš Latinák and Natália Kubičková.

Couples performed the tango or jive.

Running order

Week 4 
Individual judges scores in the chart below (given in parentheses) are listed in this order from left to right: Adriana Kmotríková, Ján Ďurovčík, Eva Máziková, Peter Modrovský.

Couples performed the Slowfox or samba.

Running order

Week 5 
Individual judges scores in the chart below (given in parentheses) are listed in this order from left to right: Andrea Heringhová, Ján Ďurovčík, Eva Máziková, Peter Modrovský.

Couples performed unlearned dances and dance duel.

Running order

Week 6 
Individual judges scores in the chart below (given in parentheses) are listed in this order from left to right: Mário "Kuly" Kollár, Ján Ďurovčík, Eva Máziková, Peter Modrovský.

Couples performed unlearned dances and Salsa.

Running order

Week 7 
Individual judges scores in the chart below (given in parentheses) are listed in this order from left to right: Lukáš Latinák, Ján Ďurovčík, Eva Máziková, Peter Modrovský.

Couples performed unlearned dances and Folklore.

Running order

Week 8 
Individual judges scores in the chart below (given in parentheses) are listed in this order from left to right: Ivana Christová, Ján Ďurovčík, Eva Máziková, Peter Modrovský.

Couples performed unlearned dances, favorite dance and Showdance.

Running order

Dance chart
The celebrities and dance partners danced one of these routines for each corresponding week:
 Week 1: Cha-cha-cha or waltz
 Week 2: Quickstep or rumba
 Week 3: Tango or jive
 Week 4: Slowfox or samba
 Week 5: One unlearned dance and dance duels
 Week 6: One unlearned dance and salsa
 Week 7: One unlearned dance and Folklore
 Week 8: One unlearned dances, favorite dance and Showdance

Reception

Critical response
The reality television received negative reviews from ČSFD.cz, a local review aggregator website devoted to film and news that includes TV content as well. As of April 8, 2015, the site's consensus reports 13 out of 100% based on 94 online reviews, with most of them criticizing the format as whole.

TV ratings
The broadcast of the show scored an average 22.5% ratings share among persons aged 12–54, attracting roughly 245,000 viewers in the demographic per episode. Ratings somewhat increased as the real-time event progressed after its pilot episode. The second and sixth sequel saw an increase of 2.3 and 1.6%, receiving an overall viewership of 262,000 and 241,000 respectively. Nevertheless, the title wouldn't make it to the top, stalling at No. 2 each night since.

In the general 12+ target group, the program provided a series of high ratings in a row, becoming the most watched prime time telecast in the region. On four out of six occasions to date, it was watched by more than half a million audiences, reaching the peak with 572,000 viewers for the fourth. The numbers dropped to the series-lowest 24.3% ratings share, or rather its least 488,000 viewers, upon its fifth instalment that felt on Easter Sunday. The following week, the show restored lost figures, achieving its highest share ever which exceeded 30%.

References

External links
 
 Tanec snov (at Reality-show.Panacek.com)

2015 Slovak television seasons
Dancing with the Stars